Bracelets is a 1931 British crime film directed by Sewell Collins and starring Bert Coote, Joyce Kennedy and Harold Huth. A jeweler is targeted by confidence tricksters pretending to be connected with the exiled Russian Royal Family. He manages to turn the tables on them, and, after collecting the reward for their arrest, uses the money to buy silver bracelets for his wife to celebrate their wedding anniversary.

The film was made as a second feature by the large British company Gaumont British Picture Corporation. It was made at the Lime Grove Studios in Shepherd's Bush. The film's sets were designed by the French-born art director Andrew Mazzei. The director Sewell Collins wrote the screenplay, adapting his own stage play.

Cast
 Bert Coote as Edwin Hobbett  
 Joyce Kennedy as Annie Moran  
 D. A. Clarke-Smith as Joe le Sage  
 Margaret Emden as Mrs. Hobbett 
 Frederick Leister as Slim Symes  
 Stella Arbenina as Countess Soumbatoff 
 Harold Huth as Maurice Dupont  
 George Merritt as Director

References

Bibliography
Chibnall, Steve. Quota Quickies: The Birth of the British 'B' Film. British Film Institute, 2007.
Low, Rachael. Filmmaking in 1930s Britain. George Allen & Unwin, 1985.
Wood, Linda. British Films, 1927–1939. British Film Institute, 1986.

External links

1931 films
British crime films
British black-and-white films
1931 crime films
Films directed by Sewell Collins
Films shot at Lime Grove Studios
Gainsborough Pictures films
British films based on plays
Films set in England
1930s English-language films
1930s British films